ŽRK Bekament Bukovička Banja Aranđelovac is a women's handball club from Aranđelovac in Serbia. ŽRK Bukovička Banja competes in the Super Liga.

Honours 

 Super Liga
 Winners (2) : 2007, 2016

European record

Team

Current squad 

Squad for the 2016–17 season

Goalkeepers
 Ana Kacarevic
 Marijana Karic 
 Marija Simic
  Ilijana Ugrcic

Wingers
RW
  Ana Kojic
  Tamara Zarkovic
LW 
  Tamara Grbic
  Timea Milosevic
Line players 
  Marija Petrovic
  Sanja Rajovic

Back players
LB
  Milica Anic
  Tamara Prekovic
  Andjela Radojicic
  Katarina Stanic
CB 
  Danjiela Ilic
  Maja Radoicic 
  Marina Tomic 
RB
  Jovana Djokovic
  Jovana Mrljes
  Ana Tomkovic

External links

 
 EHF Club profile

Serbian handball clubs